Mitch Harris (born October 31, 1969) is an American guitarist. He started his career in the grindcore band Righteous Pigs. He did a side project with Mick Harris – then the drummer of grindcore band Napalm Death – called Defecation. Shortly thereafter, he left Righteous Pigs and joined Napalm Death permanently in 1989, firstly appearing on the Harmony Corruption album. He is still with them, playing guitar and back-up vocals. He also participated in the projects Meathook Seed, Little Giant Drug, and Goatlord. In 2013, a featured song called "K.C.S." was included on the album Savages by the heavy metal band Soulfly that was released on October 4, 2013, and was written by Harris and Max Cavalera.

His latest band project is called Brave the Cold, and their debut album, Scarcity, is set to be released digitally on October 2, 2020, on the label Mission Two Entertainment.

References

External links
 

1969 births
Living people
Death metal musicians
American expatriates in the United Kingdom
American heavy metal guitarists
American heavy metal singers
Singers from New York City
Songwriters from New York (state)
musicians from Wolverhampton
Guitarists from New York City
American male guitarists
21st-century American singers
21st-century American guitarists
21st-century American male singers
Grindcore musicians
American male songwriters